Charles F. Brannock (May 16, 1903 – November 22, 1992) was the inventor and manufacturer of the Brannock Device for measuring overall length, width, and heel-to-ball length of the foot.

Biography
The son of a shoe industry entrepreneur, Brannock attended Syracuse University, New York, where he was a member of Delta Kappa Epsilon fraternity. He was proprietor of the Park-Brannock Shoe Store in Syracuse, New York and spent two years developing a simple means of measuring the length, width, and arch length of the human foot. He eventually improved on the wooden RITZ Stick, the industry standard of the day, patenting his first prototype in 1925 and an improved version in 1927. The instrument was a sales aid, but by ensuring more accurate fittings, the device also helped his customers alleviate or avoid foot problems due to ill-fitting shoes. Though there were competing measuring devices on the market, the Brannock Device quickly became the industry standard and is still used in shoe stores all over the world. Brannock later formed the Brannock Device Company to manufacture and sell the product. Brannock also developed specially calibrated devices for the various branches of the military, which issued millions of boots and shoes to servicemen, especially during World War II. Brannock headed the company until 1992 when he died at age 89.

Patents
Charles F. Brannock, "Foot-Measuring Instrument," U.S. Patent 1,682,366

References

Craig, Berry. "Why the Shoe Fits." American Heritage of Invention & Technology 16, no. 1. (Summer 2000): 64.
Davidson, Martha. "A Fitting Place for the Brannock Device Company Records." 2001.
National Inventors Hall of Fame profile
Brannock Device Company Records, 1925–1998

1903 births
1992 deaths
20th-century American inventors